Business House is a constructivist building in Tsentralny City District of Novosibirsk, Russia. It is located on the corner of Krasny Avenue and Lenin Street. The building is a part of the architectural ensemble of Lenin Square. It was built in 1928. Architects: D. F. Fridman, I. A. Burlakov.

Gallery

See also
 Gosbank Building
 House of Lenin
 Novosibirsk Opera and Ballet Theatre
 Oblpotrebsoyuz Building

References

Tsentralny City District, Novosibirsk
Buildings and structures in Novosibirsk
Buildings and structures completed in 1928
Constructivist architecture
Cultural heritage monuments of federal significance in Novosibirsk Oblast